John Ashworth may refer to:

John Ashworth (cricketer) (1850–1901), English cricketer
John Ashworth (footballer), English professional footballer
John Ashworth (judge) (1906–1975), England judge and barrister
John Ashworth (preacher) (1813–1875), English preacher, manufacturer, and author
John Ashworth (rugby union) (born 1949), New Zealand rugby union player
John Ashworth (biologist) (born 1938), former vice-chancellor of the University of Salford and former director of the LSE
John Ashworth (priest), Dean of Trinidad

See also
Jon Ashworth (born 1978), British Labour Party politician and MP